Ferguslie Park is the second album by the Scottish rock band Stealers Wheel, released in 1973.

Track listing

Personnel 

 Gerry Rafferty – vocals, acoustic and electric guitars, mandolin, piano, kazoo
 Joe Egan – vocals, piano, organ, acoustic guitar, kazoo
 Peter Robinson – acoustic piano, electric piano, Hammond organ, pipe organ, synthesizers, chimes
 Gary Taylor – bass guitar, Minimoog synthesizer
 Joe Jammer – electric guitar
 Andy Steele – drums, tambourine, congas, triangle, chimes, maracas, wood blocks, cowbell, claves, jawbones
 Bernie Holland – electric guitar
 Chris Neale – harmonica
 Corky Hale – harp
 Steve Gregory – tenor saxophone
 Chris Mercer – tenor saxophone
 Mike Stoller – electric harpsichord, horn arrangements, producer
 Richard Hewson – string arrangements

Technical
 Phill Brown – engineer
 Mike Stoller – producer
 John Patrick Byrne - cover artwork

References

1973 albums
Stealers Wheel albums
Albums produced by Jerry Leiber
Albums produced by Mike Stoller
A&M Records albums